Journal of Language and Social Psychology is a peer-reviewed academic journal that publishes papers in the fields of Communication and Psychology. The journal's editor is Howard Giles (University of California Santa Barbara). It has been in publication since 1982 and is currently published by SAGE Publications.

Scope 
Journal of Language and Social Psychology is devoted to the social psychology of language. The journal publishes reports of research and theory at the cross-roads of language, mind and society. Journal of Language and Social Psychology presents articles from a range of disciplines including linguistics, cognitive science and anthropology with a focus on quantitative, experimental studies and positivistic theory.

Abstracting and indexing 
Journal of Language and Social Psychology is abstracted and indexed in, among other databases:  SCOPUS, and the Social Sciences Citation Index. According to the Journal Citation Reports, its 2017 impact factor is 1.233, ranking it 46 out of 64 journals in the category ‘Psychology, Social’. and 59 out of 181 journals in the category ‘Linguistics’. and 45 out of 84 journals in the category ‘Communication’.

References

External links 
 

SAGE Publishing academic journals
English-language journals